The office of Mayor of Galway is an honorific title used by the  of Galway City Council. The council has jurisdiction throughout its administrative area of the city of Galway which is the largest city in the province of Connacht, in Ireland. The current mayor is Clodagh Higgins, (FG).

Election to the office
The Mayor is elected to office annually by Councillors of Galway City Council from amongst its members. There is no popular vote. Up to 1841, Mayors were elected in August and took office in September. There was a strong tradition of festivities to mark this start of a new municipal year. Current practice is for the term of office to begin in June with the former Mayor presenting the Chain of Office to the incoming Mayor, thus formally inaugurating a new term.  The process is repeated the following June, unless the same person is given a second consecutive term.

History of the office
The office was originally established by a charter issued by King Richard III of England in December 1484 and had significant powers. The office has existed, with a break of ninety-seven years, since it was inaugurated in 1485. The Mayor led Galway Corporation from 1485 to 1841 and again from 1937 to 2001.

Prior to the creation of the mayoralty, the town of Galway was ruled by a Provost or Sovereign, who was appointed by the Earl of Ulster.  After the murder of the 3rd Earl in June 1333, the town was under the control of successive members of the Clanricarde line of the House of Burke family.  This situation lasted until well into the 15th century. However, charters from Richard II (in 1396) and Edward IV (in 1464) gave the citizens of the town semi-independence from the Clanricardes.

The office of Mayor of Galway was created by a charter issued by King Richard III of England in December 1484 at the solicitation of merchants from the city's leading families, known as the Tribes of Galway. This made Galway a virtual city-state.  Although it survived the turbulent 17th century, the massive corruption of the office led to its disestablishment in 1841, when Galway Corporation was relegated to the status of an Urban District Council, headed by a chairman. In 1937 the city regained its corporation status and the office of Mayor was re-installed.

The office was all but abolished under the Local Government Act 2001. All that remains of the office, per section 11 of the Act is a symbolic role: "Subject to this Act, royal charters and letters patent relating to local authorities shall continue to apply for ceremonial and related purposes in accordance with local civic tradition but shall otherwise cease to have effect.". The Act goes on to state the chairman of the Council must be styled the Cathaoirleach and that "Any reference in any other enactment to the lord mayor, mayor, chairman, deputy lord mayor, deputy mayor or vice-chairman or cognate words shall, where the context so requires, be read as a reference to the Cathaoirleach or Leas-Chathaoirleach or other title standing for the time being." (section 31 (3)).

List of mayors
List of mayors of Galway (from 1485)

See also
List of rulers and officers of Galway 1230–1485

References

External links
Galway City Council Page

 
 
Politics of Galway (city)